Jurong East Stadium is a multi-purpose stadium in Jurong East, Singapore. It is opened from 7am to 7.30pm.

It is currently used mostly for football matches and is the home stadium of Albirex Niigata Singapore FC and Tanjong Pagar United.

The stadium holds 2,700 people and opened in 1998. It is one of only three stadiums in Singapore that does not have a running track, and was built to serve only as a football stadium.

Location
The stadium is located in Jurong East, but it is closer to Chinese Garden MRT station.

History
The stadium was built in 1988,and till now, serves as the home stadium for Albirex Niigata Singapore FC.
From 2020, Tanjong Pagar United also uses the stadium as its home stadium.

Facilities & Structures
1 Field1 Jogging Track

Transport
The stadium is accessible by MRT, bus and taxi. Alight at Chinese Garden MRT station on the East West Line to reach the stadium.

See also
List of stadiums in Singapore

References

Sports venues in Singapore
Football venues in Singapore
Jurong East
Multi-purpose stadiums in Singapore
Singapore Premier League venues
Jurong FC

External links
https://www.myactivesg.com/Facilities/jurong-east-stadium